A cinder track is a type of race track, generally purposed for track and field or horse racing, whose surface is composed of cinders. For running tracks, many cinder surfaces have been replaced by all-weather synthetic surfaces, which provide greater durability and more consistent results, and are less stressful on runners. The impact on performance as a result of differing track surfaces is a topic often raised when comparing athletes from different eras.

Synthetic tracks emerged in the late 1960s; the 1964 Olympics were the last to use a cinder track.

The Little 500 bicycle race at Indiana University is still run annually on a cinder track.

References

Playing field surfaces